Whitecaps FC Academy is a Canadian soccer team, the academy of professional team Vancouver Whitecaps FC. They were originally known as the Whitecaps Residency program.

About
Whitecaps FC Academy is a full-time, fully funded, player development program. Originally known as the Vancouver Whitecaps Residency programs, they changed their name in 2018 to the Whitecaps FC Academy. They have affiliations with youth soccer clubs across Canada, forming part of the Whitecaps FC BMO Academy.

Team Records

Year-by-year

Men

Professional players from the Whitecaps FC Academy

External links
 Residency Program
 Mountain WFC
 Surrey WFC
 Coastal WFC
 Academy

References

Association football clubs established in 2007
Vancouver Whitecaps
League1 British Columbia clubs